Yazvitsevo is a rural locality (a village) in Nikolskoye Rural Settlement, Kaduysky District, Vologda Oblast, Russia. The population was 15 as of 2002.

Geography 
Yazvitsevo is located 51 km northeast of Kaduy (the district's administrative centre) by road. Krasnoye is the nearest rural locality.

References 

Rural localities in Kaduysky District